Alfred Brooks, also known as Alfred Brooks Pew or Al Brooks (October 19, 1916 – December 15, 2005) was an American early influencer of counterculture, founder of a modern dance company called Munt-Brooks, and later founder of the experimental theatre group, The Changing Scene.

Early life and education
Alfred Brooks Pew was born in Kansas City on October 19, 1916, the youngest of five children born to John Brooks Pew and Maysie Virginia Pew. Brooks attended the Juilliard School in New York with B.A and M.A. degrees in musical composition. As a student at Juilliard he was first exposed to modern dance, and he studied dance with Hanya Holm.

Career 
In 1952, Brooks opened Munt-Brooks dance studio in New York City with his wife Maxine Munt.

In 1968, Brooks and Munt opened the non-profit, theatre/dance school called The Changing Scene in Denver, Colorado, after closing the Munt-Brooks dance studio in New York a few years prior. Everything was volunteer based and was devoted to presenting not just dance and theatre but new work in all media. The Changing Scene was the first to have featured profanity, nudity and sexual situations on a Denver stage and in 1968 they were raided by the Denver vice squad because, Brooks said, "officers misunderstood what an offering called Organum must have been about".

Brooks was a co-founder of the Colorado Theatre Guild.

After Maxine Munt's death in January 2000, The Changing Scene closed. The Changing Scene influenced a new generation of bohemian theatre including the Changing Scene Northwest, created by a former board member after they moved to Washington.

References

1916 births
2005 deaths
Modern dance companies
Modern dancers
Juilliard School alumni
American dance groups
Counterculture communities
People from Kansas City, Missouri
Artists from Denver